The St. John's Curling Club (officially the St. John's Curling Association) is a curling club in St. John's, Newfoundland and Labrador, Canada. The club plays at the RE/MAX Centre in Central St. John's, on Mayor Ave. It is the largest curling club in the province.

History
The club was founded on July 8, 1910 when the Terra Nova Curling Club and the Micmac Curling Club were amalgamated. From 1912 to 1941, the club was located at the Newfoundland Curling Rink Ltd. on Forest Road. The club bought a new rink in 1941, but it burned down before the season started. In 1943, the club moved to a rink on Factory Lane. In addition to curling, this rink also allowed for skating and dancing. The St. John's Ladies Curling Club was integrated in 1959. In 1976 the club moved to a new rink on Bonaventure Avenue, which was renamed RE/MAX Centre in 2006.

Champions
The club is most notable for being the home of the 2006 Winter Olympic champion team of Brad Gushue, Mark Nichols, Russ Howard, Jamie Korab and Mike Adam. Gushue currently curls out of both the Bally Haly Golf & Curling Club and the St. John's Curling Club.

The first Newfoundland team to win the Brier, hailed from the St. John's Curling Club. The team of Jack MacDuff, Toby McDonald, Doug Hudson and Ken Templeton won the 1976 Macdonald Brier. As of 2015, teams from the St. John's Curling Club have won 39 Newfoundland and Labrador Tankards, the provincial men's championship.

The club has won two Canadian Junior Curling Championships. Brad Gushue and his rink of Mike Adam, Brent Hamilton and Mark Nichols won the men's title in 2001. The team went on to win a gold medal at the 2001 World Junior Curling Championships. Stacie Devereaux, Stephanie Guzzwell, Sarah Paul and Julie Devereaux won the women's 2007 Canadian Junior Curling Championships and won a silver medal for Canada at the 2007 World Junior Curling Championships.

While curling out of the club, Mark Nichols, Shelley Nichols, Brent Hamilton and Jennifer Guzzwell won the 2005 Canadian Mixed Curling Championship, the only time the province has won a Canadian Mixed title.

The club also won the only men's Canadian Senior Curling Championships for the province, when Bas Buckle, Bob Freeman, Gerry Young and Harvey Holloway won in 2004. The team went on to win a gold medal at the 2005 World Senior Curling Championships.

Finally, the club won its first Travelers Curling Club Championship in 2015, when Andrew Symonds, Mark Healy, Cory Ewart and Keith Jewerwon the men's title.

References

1910 establishments in Canada
Curling clubs in Canada
Sports venues in St. John's, Newfoundland and Labrador
Curling in Newfoundland and Labrador
Curling clubs established in 1910